Apocolotois is a genus of moths in the family Geometridae described by Wehrli in 1936.

Species
 Apocolotois almatensis Djakonov, 1952
 Apocolotois arnoldiaria (Oberthür, 1912)
 Apocolotois smirnovi Romanoff, 1885

References
 

Colotoini
Geometridae genera